Obin is a surname. Notable people with the surname include:

Jean-Marie Obin, Haitian painter, daughter of Philomé Obin
Jérémy Obin (born 1993), French footballer
Louis-Henri Obin (1820–1895), French opera singer
Philomé Obin (1892–1986), Haitian painter
Sénèque Obin (1893–1977), Haitian painter